Tourism in Mauritius is an important component of the Mauritian economy as well as a significant source of its foreign exchange revenues.  The tourism industry is also a major economic pillar on the island of Rodrigues; however, tourism has not been developed in Agaléga Islands. Mauritius is mostly appreciated by tourists for its natural environment and man-made attractions, the multi-ethnic and cultural diversity of the population, the tropical climate, beaches and water sports.

History 
In the past thirty years, Mauritius has developed from a low-income economy based on agriculture to a middle-income diversified economy. Much of this economic growth has been the result of the expansion of the luxury tourism sector. Mauritius was mainly dependent on the sugar and textiles industries; as world sugar prices declined and the production of textiles became economically unfeasible, the government decided to expand the tourist industry.
Over the years, most visitors to Mauritius have come from European countries. Due to the economic downturn of European debt crisis, the government decided to diversify its market by providing direct flights to Asian and African countries which were experiencing higher growth in terms of their arrival.

Overview  

The tourism sector is supervised by the Ministry of Tourism and Leisure. The Mauritius Tourism Promotion Authority (MTPA) promotes Mauritius by conducting advertising campaigns, participating in tourism fairs and organizing, in collaboration with the local tourism industry, promotional campaign and activities in Mauritius and abroad. The Tourism Authority (TA) is responsible for licensing, regulating and supervising the activities of tourist enterprises, pleasure craft, skippers and canvassers. It also contributes to the uplifting of the destination and  provides technical assistance to Rodrigues island. The Association des Hôteliers et Restaurateurs de l'île Maurice (AHRIM) is a non-profitable organization set up in 1973 to represent and promote the interests of hotels and restaurants in Mauritius.

Major Mauritian hotel groups include LUX* Resorts & Hotels, Beachcomber Resorts & Hotels, Sun Resorts, Constance, Long Beach resorts, Attitude and VLH/Heritage.

Mauritius currently has two UNESCO World Heritage Sites, namely Aapravasi Ghat and Le Morne Cultural Landscape. Additionally, Black River Gorges National Park is currently on the UNESCO tentative list.

Statistics 
According  Statistics Mauritius, total passenger arrivals to Mauritius in 2011 was 1,294,387 and tourist arrivals for the year attained 964,642. In 2012, two emerging markets, the Russian Federation and People’s Republic of China, registered positive growths of 58.9% and 38.0%, respectively. According to the Bank of Mauritius, the gross tourism receipts was Rs44 billion ( equal to US$ 949 million ) in 2012. The forecast number of tourist arrival for 2013 was 1 million.

Data from Statsmauritius.govmu.org on tourism arrivals for 2018 shows that "1.The number of tourist arrivals for the year 2018 increased by 4.3% to attain 1,399,408 compared to 1,341,860 for the year 2017 2. Tourist arrivals by air increased by 3.6% from 1,312,295 in 2017 to 1,359,688 in 2018 while those arriving by sea increased by 34.3% from 29,565 to 39,720. 3. The performance of our main markets, which accounted for 71% of total tourist arrivals for the year 2018".

See also 

 Mauritius Tourism Promotion Authority (MTPA)
 Visa policy of Mauritius

References

External links

 
Mauritius